Rabbit's Moon is an avant-garde short film by American filmmaker Kenneth Anger. Filmed in 1950, Rabbit's Moon was not completed (nor did it see release) until 1971. Anger re-released the film in 1979, sped up and with a different soundtrack.

Filmed under a blue filter and set within a wooded glade during the night, the plot revolves around a clown, Pierrot, his longing for the Moon (in which a rabbit lives – a concept found in both East Asian folklore and Aztec mythology), and his futile attempts to jump up and catch it. Subsequently, another clown (Harlequin) appears and teases Pierrot, showing him Columbina, with whom he appears to fall in love.

Production

The sets were borrowed from French filmmaker Jean-Pierre Melville.

Music

The 1971 version of Rabbit's Moon features a soundtrack consisting of 1950s and '60s pop: "There's a Moon Out Tonight" by The Capris, "Oh, What a Night" by The Dells, "Bye Bye Baby" by Mary Wells, "I Only Have Eyes For You" by The Flamingos and "Tears On My Pillow" by The El Dorados. The 1979 version features only a loop of A Raincoat's "It Came In The Night" as its soundtrack.

Legacy

The film is credited by electronic duo Rabbit in the Moon as the inspiration for their name.

See also
 Commedia dell'arte
 List of avant-garde films of the 1950s

References

External links

1950 films
1950s avant-garde and experimental films
1979 short films
Films directed by Kenneth Anger
1950 short films
1971 short films
1971 films
1979 films
1970s English-language films
1950s English-language films
1950s American films
1970s American films